Hexamethylene triperoxide diamine (HMTD) is a  high explosive organic compound. HMTD is an organic peroxide, a heterocyclic compound with a cage-like structure. It is a primary explosive. It has been considered as an initiating explosive for blasting caps in the early part of 20th century, mostly because of its high initiating power (higher than that of mercury fulminate) and its inexpensive production. As such, it was quickly taken up as a primary explosive in mining applications. However, it has since been superseded by more (chemically) stable compounds such as dextrinated lead azide and DDNP (which contains no lead or mercury). HMTD is widely used in amateur-made blasting caps.

Preparation and structure
First synthesised in 1885 by the German chemist Ludwig Legler, HMTD may be prepared by the reaction of an aqueous solution of hydrogen peroxide and hexamine in the presence of an acid catalyst, such as citric acid, acetic acid or dilute sulfuric acid. The hydrogen peroxide needs to be at least 12% w/w concentration, as lower concentrations lead to poor yields. Citric acid is overall superior to other acids, providing a yield of up to about 50%.

The molecule adopts a cage-like structure with the nitrogen atoms having an unusual trigonal planar geometry.

Properties as an explosive
Like other organic peroxides, such as acetone peroxide (TATP), HMTD is unstable and detonates upon shock, friction, static electricity discharges, concentrated sulfuric acid, strong UV radiation and heat. Cases of detonation caused by the simple act of screwing a lid on a jar containing HMTD have been reported. Common static electricity discharges have been reported to cause detonation. It is, however, less unstable than many other peroxides under normal conditions; exposure to ultraviolet light increases its sensitivity. It also reacts with most common metals, which can lead to detonation. HMTD is chemically very stable when pure (free of acids, bases, and metal ions) and does not quickly sublime like its acetone counterparts.

HMTD is a more powerful initiating explosive than mercury fulminate, but its poor thermal and chemical stability prevents its use in detonators. Nevertheless, HMTD is one of the three most widely used primary explosives in improvised, amateur made blasting caps. The other being TATP and silver acetylide.

HMTD is a common source of injury among amateur chemists, particularly finger amputations. Most of these injuries are caused by small amounts of HMTD that inadvertently detonate in close proximity of fingers, since small amounts (grams) are generally not powerful enough to amputate fingers from distances larger than 5 – 10 cm. Experienced amateurs handle HMTD in such a manner as to avoid any close contact between fingers and the explosive itself, from synthesis to final detonation. Such measures, for example, include using multiple filter papers during the filtration step that are exchanged as not to have more than 0.2 g of HMTD on a single filter paper, pre-bent papers with cotton wrapped wooden rods for manipulation and blast mitigation devices for final filling.

Calculated (Explo5) detonation pressure Pcj at crystal density 1.597 g/cm3 is 218 kbar with velocity of detonation VoD = 7777 m/s. Explosion temperature is 3141 K, energy of explosion is 5612 kJ/kg (or 3400 - 4000 kJ/kg per various sources) and volume of explosion gases at STP is calculated to be 826 L/kg. Loose powder has density close to 0.4 g/cm3, hence the common detonation velocities are closer to 3000 m/s and Pcj is closer to 15 kbar.

Sensitivity
HMTD is overall slightly more sensitive than fresh TATP and can be considered to be slightly more dangerous than an average primary explosive. The variance of friction force between different surfaces (e.g. different kinds of paper) is often greater than the variance between the friction sensitivity of a given pair of primary explosives. This leads to different values for friction sensitivity measured at different laboratories.

Terrorism
Despite no longer being used in any military application, and despite its shock sensitivity, HMTD remains a common home-made explosive and has been used in a large number of suicide bombings and other attacks throughout the world.  For example, it was one of the components in the explosives intended to bomb Los Angeles International Airport in the 2000 millennium attack plots
and the 2016 New York and New Jersey bombings, as well as one of the components of the explosives attempted to be made by the neo-Nazi terrorist organization Atomwaffen Division in the United States.

References

Organic peroxides
Explosive chemicals
Diamines
Organic peroxide explosives